The World Sport Stacking Association (WSSA) is the international governing body for sport stacking. The WSSA, which is headquartered in Englewood, Colorado, sanctions stacking competitions worldwide and maintains world and national records for the sport.

History
In 2001, Bob Fox, the founder of the cup manufacturer Speed Stacks, formed the World Cup Stacking Association (WCSA). The WCSA formally renamed themselves the World Sport Stacking Association to coincide with the new name for the sport in 2005.

References

Sport stacking
International sports organizations
Sports organizations established in 2001